Alldays may refer to:
 Alldays, Limpopo, a town in South Africa
 Alldays (supermarket), a chain of convenience stores in the UK
 Always Alldays, a brand of panty liner marketed by Procter & Gamble
 Alldays (1898 Automobile), an early British automobile